was a Japanese fascist political party in Japan active in the 1930s.

In 1931, Home Minister Adachi Kenzō spoke out strongly in support of the Imperial Japanese Army’s unauthorized incursions into Manchuria and against the diplomatic policies pursued by Kijūrō Shidehara, and was expelled from the ranks of the Rikken Minseitō. Joining together with Nakano Seigō, Akira Kazami, and others, Adachi formed the right-wing political organization Kokumin Dōmei in December 1932

The Kokumin Dōmei advocated for a dirigiste economy with government control of strategic industries and financial institutions, and the creation of a Japan-Manchukuo economic union.

The new party consisted mainly of defectors from the Minseitō, and had an original strength of 32 seats in the Diet of Japan. In 1934, it demanded an inquiry into the Teijin Incident in an effort to bring down the cabinet of Prime Minister Saitō Makoto. However, in 1935, many members returned to the Minseitō fold, and in 1936, Nakano left the party to form the Tōhōkai the following year, and Kazami joining Fumimaro Konoe’s think tank, the Shōwa Kenkyūkai. In the 1937 General Election, the party's strength fell from 32 seats to 11 seats.

In June 1940, The Kokumin Dōmei was merged into the Imperial Rule Assistance Association as part of Hideki Tōjō's efforts to create a one-party state, and thereafter ceased to exist.

Election results

References

Citations

Bibliography
 
 

Political parties established in 1932
Political parties disestablished in 1940
Far-right politics in Japan
Fascist parties
Shōwa Statism
Defunct political parties in Japan
Fascism in Japan